Lee Hak Kan (born 6 December 1967), better known as Hacken Lee, is a Hong Kong singer, television host and actor, active since the 1980s. In 2013, Lee's song "House of Cards" swept multiple awards in many Hong Kong award ceremonies, including "World's Best Song" and "Broadcasting Index" in Metro's Awards. As of 2013, he has reached 14 times in receiving the "Outstanding Pop Singer Award" at RTHK's "Top Ten Chinese Gold Songs Awards" and has established an irreplaceable status in the music industry of Hong Kong and Asia.

Life and career

Early years: 1980s

Lee was brought up in a middle-class family. He lived in Arts Mansion in Happy Valley during his teenage years. He studied in Pun U Association Primary School (1974-1980) and Wah Yan College, Hong Kong (1980-1987).

After his HKCEE in 1985, he entered the TVB new talent show along with Alex To, William So, Vivian Chow and Grasshopper, though he was unable to make it into the top 15 finalists. He then participated in the Second Hong Kong 19 District Singing Contest in 1985, a competition which he won with his rendition of Alan Tam's song "Love in the Fog" (霧之戀).  He was subsequently offered a contract with PolyGram Records.

Lee however continued his studies at Wah Yan College while singing part-time. He turned full-time in summer 1987 after failing to gain a university place due to poor HKALE results.

His debut EP Hacken Lee EP sold less than 10,000 copies. Symbol of Destiny was released in 1987. His musical popularity lacking, he gained recognition by starring in TVB dramas in the late 1980s, especially the youth drama series "Teenage No More" (不再少年時), for which he also sang the theme song. In 1989, his song "Unchanged in Lifetime", the theme song of ATV's Cantonese version of the drama series "Blue Moon," won both RTHK "Top Ten Chinese Gold Songs Awards" and "TVB Jade Solid Gold Awards."

1990s
In 1990, Lee, Jacky Cheung and Andy Lau were dubbed as "Three Musketeers in the music industry" by the media and were hailed as "tomorrow's highly anticipated superstars". Later on that year, however, due to the contract disputes between Hacken and his company, Hacken's career faltered.

In 1992, Lee's career began to rise when he released the song "Red Sun" (紅日), for which he penned the Chinese lyrics that made it popular. In 1993, Hacken switched to Star Record Company and released the song "Look Back," which once again boosted his singing career and allowed him to win TVB Jade Solid Gold's Golden Award as well as reach the top five nominees for the Most Popular Singer Award. His first solo concert at Hong Kong Coliseum, alter that year, sold out in just a few hours.

In 1994, Lee was crowned the title of "Zero Defect Vocals," alongside Jacky Cheung who was named "Perfect Vocals" the year before, and as well as the successor of the famous Alan Tam, whom Hacken idolized since he was little.

In 1995, after the unprecedented success of his first solo concert, Hacken was full of confidence to hold his second concert again at Hong Kong Coliseum, "Dragon '95 Hacken's Contact of Hear Concert", total of 10 days. But the box office was very poor unfortunately, the worst situation was less than 40% attendance figures. This experience also is one of the most embarrassing thing in his singing career. His momentum continues to decline after the concert, together with contractual disputes between the record company, Hacken's singing career was started to fell in the trough.

In 1996, Lee was signed on to another company where he issued the album "When I Found You" (當找到你), with the sales and popularity seemed to be improved slightly. However, due to several personnel changes and contractual disputes, since they released the album "By Hacken Side" (在克勤身邊), his career became stalled, even the new album was postponed indefinitely.

In summer 1998, Lee was chaired as TVB for World Cup association football's sportscaster, and he composed and sing the song for the program, "Adverture of football fans", the song was popular though streets and lanes, the record company launched a selection album by this momentum. As an avid Manchester United fan, he also is the chairperson and president of its Hong Kong Fan Club.  He also penned a public outcry against embattled former manager David Moyes on Hacken's personal Weibo.

After the contract was expired with the record company, Lee had quite a long period cannot found a suitable recording company, he fought in TV media from singing career, filming drama and host the TV programs, such as Jade Solid Gold, to maintain the popularity.

In late 1999, Lee had under no music contract for more than 12 months, he signed to Universal Music (former PolyGram) then, and issued his album "A Year Or So". In December, he had a musical performance with the Hong Kong Repertory, named "Adventure". This musical perform across the centuries, welcoming the coming of millennium.

2000s 
After signing with Universal Music, Lee released songs including "Feet of Fortune" (前後腳), "I Won't Sing" (我不會唱歌) and "The Grasp of Love" (愛不釋手) in 2001.

In late 2001, Lee performed in collaboration with the Hong Kong Philharmonic Orchestra, "Hong Kong Philharmonic & Hacken Live", organised total in 4 concerts and 2 additional concerts. The concert series was very well-received, as was a recording released CD and VCD of the series, both CD and VCD got "Ten Best Selling Album Award" at IFPI. In July, he launched the album "Flying Flower (飛花)", with the song in same title, he won TVB Jade Solid Gold Awards's Golden Melody Award, "Metro Music Awards" Metro Best Song Award, and RTHK "Top Ten Chinese Gold Songs Award" Outstanding Pop Singer Award.

In early 2002, Lee held his solo concert "Hacken Lee Live in Concert 2002" and got the praised again, and its recordings were equally well received at IFPI. In addition, he sang for TVB World Cup program's theme song "Victory"; the song "Tall Girl" was composed by Gigi Leung, lyrics by his own, and later on ""The Grasp of Love (愛不釋手) " were very popular. At "Jade Solid Gold Awards 2002", he won the "Most Popular Male Singer Award" at first time, and he had been re-confirmed as the successor of Alan Tam. Around the time of the 2002 concert, he co-starred in the TVB drama "Legal Entanglement (法網伊人)" which was aired. The series achieved high ratings and was one of TVB's most popular dramas that year. He won the "Most Favourite Character" award at the "2002 TVB Anniversary Awards" for his role in the series. Additionally, he was appointed the host of the 2002 World Cup and sang the theme song of TVB, which dominated the local charts for some time. He also won his first Most Popular Male Singer in TVB Jade Solid Gold Award.

In 2003, 2004 and 2009, Lee partnered with Alan Tam in a series of concert tours around the world, including multiple shows in Hong Kong and Las Vegas. Known in English as "Alan & Hacken", the show's Chinese title, "左麟右李", is a play on the Chinese four-character idiom "左鄰右里" which means "neighbor", by using the artists' names homonyms 麟 and 李. By the end of 2003, Hacken won the Most Popular Male Singer in TVB Jade Solid Gold Award" again, this was the second time he got this award.

In November 2004, Lee partnered with Joey Yung in a collaboration of a concert, which is better known by another four-character idiom "刻不容緩 (Urgency cannot afford delay)", once again using their names homonyms 克 and 容. As the concerts perform continuously, causing his vocal strain and muscle sprains, that led his voice got problem, but he launched the song "Urgency cannot afford delay". He has been called one of the "New 4 Heavenly King" by Alan Tam. In the end of 2004, Hacken swept the awards in music award ceremonies again, including Top Ten Chinese Gold Song by RTHK's "Best Pop Male Artist Award", and his live album "Alan & Hacken 2004 Concert" got "10 Guangdong Album Sales Award" by IFPI, and he won the "Best Sales Local Singer" again.

In 2005, Lee released his fourth Mandarin album Ask About Love, he started a series of promotion activities in mainland China. By the end of 2005, He was the first Chinese artist to release a DualDisc, entitled "Hacken Lee Concert Hall". For this album, Universal Music invested over a million dollars, invited 4 Chinese musician to perform the songs of album, moreover, they gave up the general recording mode, moved to the music hall for recording, the CD side using coherent approach to record the live recordings of the songs in surround sound, and the DVD side featured the making of footage. The album was out of stock twice after it launched in a week, the sales had breakthrough a platinum figure very soon. In December, he won the "Most Popular Male Singer" of TVB Jade Solid Gold Award again, this was his third win. By the way, he won "My Favorite Singer" award and 5 song awards at "Metro Music Awards". At 1 January 2006, he won the bronze prize of the "My Favorite Singer", and talk about his 'Suit Theory' to explain the relationship between CRHK.

From 28 January 2006 to 5 February, Lee held a series of sell-out concerts at Hong Kong Coliseum, named "Hacken Lee Live In Concert 2006", which is sponsored by Carlsberg) during the Chinese New Year period, and it was the first high-definition video in Cantonese concert. Meanwhile, he hosted the World Cup program for TVB, this was his third time being a football sportscaster, and wrote the lyrics and sung for the theme song, "I'm Number 10". In the middle of year, Hacken traveled to Seoul for recording the live songs of next album, "Hacken Lee Seoul Concert Hall II". All songs were recorded at the Harmony Theatre, Koyang Culture City Hall, Korea from 28 to 31 August 2006 for live taking. Many local Korean musicians participated in the recording project, including Kwak Jung "Harpist K" on harp, So Kyoung-Jin on Korean big drum, Jang Hyo-Seok on saxophone, Kim Won-Jin as boy soprano, Kim Hyun-Mi and Jung Hyun-Suk performed "Joy of Strings" on violin, Kim Hae-Ryeon on viola, and Chung Yu-Young on cello, David Hodges from New York played an antique 1920 bandoneon while recording. The album was released on a CD with an accompanying DVD using high-definition 1080i format, dated in November 2006, was following the success of the original Concert Hall, became the favorite of Hi-Fi enthusiasts, which sold over 80,000 copies.

In 2007, Lee launched the selection album "Hacken Lee No. 1 Hits", it was released on 22 November 2007, which contains 4 CDs of his classic hits and new songs. He participated the concert held by Hong Kong Government, to celebrate the tenth anniversary of the establishment of the HKSAR organized. In the climax part of the activity, he was singing the song "Legend Of The Dragon" and "Red Sun" with 20 professional drummers and over 10,000 primary students from Hong Kong, Macau and Taiwan. This performance had been included in the Guinness World Records. In between, his environmental-themed song was named "Whispering Whose", which the song won the "Song of The Year" on Jade Solid Gold award. He also announced that his wife had given birth to his first son, Ryan Lee at Hong Kong Sanatorium and Hospital.

At 2008, Lee hosted a series of Chinese New Year concert series, which sold out 11 shows in Hong Kong from 8 to 18 February 2008, because it was between the Valentine's Day, so he featured the new song "Every Day is a Valentine's Day". And followed by a world tour. After, he was begun to prepare his new canton album by inviting some singer-songwriters to participate in the creation, such as Mavis Fan, Eason Chan, Khalil Fong, Hins Cheung, Louis Cheung, Justin Lo, Vincent Chow and Jan Lamb. In order to make a best music, the album was used 9 months for production. He just sent two new songs to radio this year, "She merciful and I'm Sad" and "What Year Is Now". Those songs received radio's favor. He also lyricist for himself, the theme song of "Alan Tam & Hacken Lee Concert 2009", the song "Needless To Scared", and being the lyricist of the song composed by Eason Chan, named "Season Changed".

Lee was a host for the Beijing Olympics broadcast in 2008, as well as the ambassador of Standard Chartered Marathon and ambassador of the East Asian Games 2009.

2010 to present 
On April 7, 2010, Lee personally announced that his wife  had given birth to their "Second Boss" (the nickname of Hacken called their second son), Rex Lee Lik-sze at Hong Kong Sanatorium & Hospital smoothly. He also announced he will continue his concert tours and recording for his new canton album in May 2010. In middle of June, his new song "Sinner" was sent to radio. On 31 July, The song was adapted from the mandarin hit song "Bad Guy" of Abin Fong. It got three championship from 3 radio station, including RTHK, CRHK, and Metro. At 4 August, he held a Moov Live mini concert, performed the 7 songs of his upcoming new album. On 15 September, his new album Sinner was officially launched.

In 2011, Lee got award again at RTHK "Top Ten Chinese Gold Songs Awards" again, made him be the unique singer that can receive song awards through four decades (1980s to 2010s). Then, he held the concert with the Hong Kong Sinfonietta, in total of 6 days, named "Hacken & Hong Kong Sinfonietta Concert Hall 2011" in summer vocation. This was Hacken collaboration with Yip Wing-sie again, since "Hong Kong Philharmonic & Hacken Live" at 2001. In this concert, his state was good and he sang over 30 tracks every night, in addition to experiencing the zero defect listening, also had some pleasantly surprised programs. The concert was full of attendance and got the great acclaim. After the concert, he released a new mandarin with cantonese album "Deja Vu", which was his launched mandarin songs since 2005. The first plug song in cantonese was "Milky Way", was the  "Three championship" held by RTHK, CRHK and Metro radio. The second plug song in cantonese was "Sky Lanterns", was boarded championship of the three radio stations on 29 October, got the "Three championship" again. At 10 December, Hacken appeared and sang for "Tung Wah Charity Show" on TVB, he was the first artist of HKRIA who can participate in TVB show after ice-breaking of HKRIA Copyright Controversy since 2010.

By January 2012, Lee won the 7th out of 10 of the song award at the "Ultimate Song Chart Awards", for the song  "Milky Way". He was invited to attend the Jade Solid Gold Awards Ceremony, as a performer and guests of honor. At early of March, he was invited to sing the Hong Kong version of the theme song, "Armageddon Prairie", for the UEFA Champions League broadcast by Now TV, and he was chair as the host and the commentator of Now TV. In late August, he released the concept of adult rhymes of the new album, Amongst The Forest. Since he got a great acclaim from collaborating with the Hong Kong Sinfonietta, he held his first solo concert tour in mainland China in September. In November, he hosted "Minute to Win It", a game show that authorized by NBC and production by TVB, and again hosted the TVB game show "Minutes to Fame" in 2005. The first episode of the show received a 30 points rating.

In January 2013, Lee attended for "Top Ten Chinese Gold Songs Awards" held by RTHK, and won the award for the song "What's The Things Alive For".

In May 2013, Lee's new song "Forward", was invited the Hong Kong Children's Choir for vocal accompaniment, which was rare inspirational song in recent years at local music scene, and also the rare allegro song of him in recent years, and was sent to the radio. "Hacken Lee Concert Hall" series was separated by 7 years, Hacken launched a brand new HiFi album again at July, named "Remakes By Hacken". After the album was released, it got the favor by the community of professional musicians, and praised by the fans. It occupied iTunes Top Songs list in the first week of release, even reached the success of double platinum album of sales.

In October 2013, he released the new canton EP, named "House of Cards", the song in same title became the Annual Golden Song, on major radio awards ceremony were impressive results. In December, Hacken was held the concert with Alan Tam, to commemorate the 10th anniversary as being "Neighbour" (左麟右李), and they're offered the world tours.

By May 2014, Lee issued a song "No Friend", which created by Eric Kwok and Wyman Wong, the song was sent to radio. The song was got widely radio and fans acclaim followed by "House of Cards". In June, he was the World Cup commentator for TVB, and launched his selection album "Selection To No Friends."

In 2015, Lee directly advanced to the semi-final of King of Mask Singer (蒙面歌王) having become the first Masked Singer to win the preliminaries and reveal his face and identity.

In 2016, Lee participated in the singing competition I Am a Singer (season 4) as the host and starting competitor and began the competition with his rendition of Alan Tam's song "Love in the Fog" (霧之戀), the song that brought him into the music industry via the singing competition he participated in 30 years ago. His consistently great weekly performances won over the hearts of many of the audience, with some of his most notable performances being his rendition of Ekin Cheng's "Days of Friendship" (友情歲月), C AllStar's "Sky Ladder" (天梯), and his 4th knockout round (ultimate knockout round) performance with renown pianist Lang Lang "I Can't Sing" (我不會唱歌), and he made it to compete in the finale (week 13) of the competition. Joey Yung sung with him in the Season 4 Biennial concert, shortly before Lee moved away from Universal Music, ending his partnership with Alan Tam, but reunites him with Joey Yung, after they had a concert in 2015.

Personal life
On November 28, 2006, Lee married his long-time girlfriend, Emily Lo Suk Yi, the winner of the 1992 Miss Hong Kong Pageant. On October 22, 2007, Lo gave birth to their first child, Ryan Lee Lap-yan. Their younger son Rex Lee Lik-sze was born on March 26, 2010.

Music

Discography

Charts

(*) Indicates still standings in charts

(1) Indicates Champion in 2 weeks

(B) Represents the songs were banned by CRHK, because their original songs policy implications.

Music Awards

Acting career
Apart from his singing career, Lee is also an actor and one of the most popular singer-turned-actor in Hong Kong. He has appeared in numerous Hong Kong dramas, movies, and commercial advertisements. He has also appeared in many large-scale charity drives as a guest performer. One of his notable roles as an actor was his role in Legal Entanglement, which won him "Most Favorite Character" award at the 2002 TVB Anniversary Awards.

Television series

Programme Host

Film

References

External links 

 Official Homepage 

1967 births
Living people
Alumni of Wah Yan
Hong Kong male film actors
Hong Kong lyricists
20th-century Hong Kong male singers
Hong Kong Mandopop singers
Hong Kong male television actors
Hong Kong television personalities
New Talent Singing Awards contestants
TVB actors
21st-century Hong Kong male singers